The Catholic Spirit is the official newspaper of the Archdiocese of Saint Paul and Minneapolis. It is a tabloid format publication that circulates to 55,000 households in the Twin Cities area.

The Catholic Spirit is a bi-weekly newspaper covering a 12-county area in east central Minnesota.

Founded in 1911 as the Catholic Bulletin, the newspaper underwent a design and name change in 1996 to become The Catholic Spirit.

The newspaper serves the communication needs of more than 825,000 Catholics in the metropolitan Minneapolis-St. Paul market, including members in 187 parishes.

The Catholic Spirit was awarded first place in the category of "General Excellence" in 2004, 2006 and 2007 by the Catholic Press Association .

References

External links
 The Catholic Spirit

Newspapers published in Minnesota
Catholic newspapers published in the United States
Newspapers established in 1911
Newspapers published in Minneapolis–Saint Paul, Minnesota
1911 establishments in Minnesota